The kotsovato (Paretroplus kieneri) is a species of cichlid from northwestern Madagascar. As presently defined its range spans several river basins, but this could possibly include more than one species. It is threatened by habitat loss and competition from introduced species. The specific name honours the French fisheries scientist André Kiener.

References

Kotsovato
Freshwater fish of Madagascar
Fish described in 1960
Taxonomy articles created by Polbot